The Memphis Tennessee Temple is the 80th operating temple of the Church of Jesus Christ of Latter-day Saints (LDS Church). The temple is located in Bartlett, Tennessee.

History
Ground was broken for the Memphis Tennessee Temple on January 16, 1999. The temple in Memphis serves more than 20,000 members in Tennessee, Arkansas, Mississippi, and Missouri. On April 23, 2000, James E. Faust dedicated the building for its religious use. The $2 million temple was the second temple to be announced in the state, after the Nashville Tennessee Temple.

On April 10, 2017, the LDS Church announced that the temple would close in October 2017 for renovations that would be completed in 2019. As the renovations neared completion, the church originally announced there would be no open house, but an update on April 11, 2019, indicated there would be an open house from April 13 to April 20, excluding Sunday. The temple was rededicated on May 5, 2019, by Jeffrey R. Holland.

In 2020, like all the church's other temples, the Memphis Tennessee Temple was closed in response to the coronavirus pandemic.

See also

 Comparison of temples of The Church of Jesus Christ of Latter-day Saints
 List of temples of The Church of Jesus Christ of Latter-day Saints
 List of temples of The Church of Jesus Christ of Latter-day Saints by geographic region
 Temple architecture (Latter-day Saints)
 The Church of Jesus Christ of Latter-day Saints in Arkansas
 The Church of Jesus Christ of Latter-day Saints in Tennessee
 The Church of Jesus Christ of Latter-day Saints in Mississippi

Additional reading

References

External links
Memphis Tennessee Temple Official site
Memphis Tennessee Temple at ChurchofJesusChristTemples.org

20th-century Latter Day Saint temples
Bartlett, Tennessee
Buildings and structures in Shelby County, Tennessee
Latter Day Saint movement in Tennessee
Religious buildings and structures in Tennessee
Temples (LDS Church) completed in 2000
Temples (LDS Church) in the United States
2000 establishments in Tennessee